Italy competed at the 2005 World Championships in Athletics in Paris, France from 6 to 14 August 2005. The nation sent a delegation of 49 athletes (27 men and 22 women) and won one medal at the competition. Alex Schwazer was the bronze medallist in the men's 50 kilometres race walk and he achieved a national record of 3:41:54 hours in the process. It was an unexpected medal, as Schwazer knocked nearly twenty minutes off his previous best that year. Among other Italian performances, three athletes finished fifth in field event finals: Nicola Ciotti (men's high jump), Giuseppe Gibilisco (men's pole vault) and Zahra Bani (women's javelin throw). Excluding the straight finals in the marathon and walks, six Italians reached the final of their track and field event.

This was Italy's worst performance on the medal table at the World Championships at that point and presaged the outcome of no medals at the 2015 World Championships in Athletics.

Medalists

Men

Women

References

External links
 The “Azzurri” at the World Championships (from 1983 to 2015)

Italy
World Championships in Athletics
2005